The 2020 Primera División season, officially Liga de Fútbol Profesional Venezolano or Liga FUTVE, was the 39th professional season of the Venezuelan Primera División, Venezuela's top-flight football league. Caracas were the defending champions.

The competition was suspended on 12 March due to the COVID-19 pandemic, with all the results recorded until then voided on 15 May, and was reset starting from 14 October with a new format, ending on 15 December 2020. Deportivo La Guaira won their first league title, beating Deportivo Táchira by a score of 2–0 in the final played at Valencia.

Format changes

Original format
The league format changed for the 2020 season. No Apertura and Clausura tournaments would be held and the 20 teams would face each other in a home-and-away round-robin tournament, for a total of 38 matches per team. The top eight teams of the first stage would advance to the semi-final stage, depending on eligibility requirements for CONMEBOL tournaments. The bottom two teams would be relegated. In the semi-final stage, the eight teams would be divided in two groups of four teams each, facing the other teams in their group twice. The two group winners would advance to the Serie Final to decide the league champions.

New format
Due to the COVID-19 pandemic, the league was suspended on 12 March. On 15 May, the FVF announced the permanent suspension of the competition, with all first stage matches being voided.

On 18 September, a new format was announced by the FVF and the Liga FUTVE, with the teams divided in two groups, playing each other twice. The group winners decided the league champions in a single match, and the next three teams of each group were awarded the remaining berths for CONMEBOL tournaments. Matches were played in Barinas, Puerto Cabello and Valencia. Relegation was suspended until 2021. Due to the format change of the Copa Sudamericana, the play-offs to decide the order of berths for the tournament were not played.

Teams
On 24 January, Llaneros was administratively relegated to the Segunda División by FVF as ordered by FIFA due to a lawsuit by former player Leonardo Ossa, whom the club failed to pay an outstanding debt. Llaneros played in the second tier during the 2020 season, therefore the league was contested by 19 teams.

Zulia and LALA withdrew from the competition on 7 September due to safety concerns caused by the pandemic.

Stadia and locations

{|

|}

Managerial changes

Effects of the COVID-19 pandemic
Due to the COVID-19 pandemic, on 12 March the Liga FUTVE announced the suspension of the seventh round of matches, scheduled for the weekend of 14–15 March. That same day, the FVF announced the suspension of every footballing activity in the country. On 15 March, the Liga FUTVE cancelled a meeting originally scheduled for 18 March and also confirmed the indefinite suspension of the Primera División tournament.

On 15 May, and after an emergency meeting held the previous day via video conference, the FVF announced the "permanent suspension" of the Primera and Segunda División seasons due to the inability to resume play under the conditions initially stated in the league regulations, effectively voiding the standings and results of matches played up until the suspension of the season. At the same time, the Federation's Commission of Club Competitions was tasked with elaborating a new tournament with a format and regulations suited to the necessary conditions for its execution, considering the application of sporting merit, club licensing requirements, and medical protocols. That same day, the Liga FUTVE issued a statement in which it rejected the suspension and voiding of the results of the 2020 season by the FVF, stating that the decision was made without consulting the league nor the teams, which was deemed to be as "a disrespect as well as putting at risk the economic and sports stability" of sports institutions.

In early June both the FVF and the Liga FUTVE presented, on their own, proposals to resume the competition. While the organization administering the league proposed to resume the tournament at the point at which it was suspended and play a single round-robin instead of a double round-robin as originally planned, with matches played only in the Carabobo state, the governing body proposed to play a new tournament from scratch with the teams split into two groups according to geographical proximity. On 14 June, the Venezuelan government authorized clubs to resume their training sessions starting from 15 June under biosecurity protocols and announced that the organizers of the football league had to put together a plan along with the National Institute of Sport (IND) to establish the new schedule and dates for the competition. Activities were also restricted to the "Carabobo-Yaracuy axis" as those were two of the states with the lowest rates of infection for COVID-19. However, following a letter sent to the FVF by FIFA in which it confirmed that the power to organize the national football league rested in the national governing body, on 10 July the Liga FUTVE decided to withdraw their proposal to resume the competition, leaving the responsibility to organize the tournament on the FVF.

On 7 September, Zulia announced that they would not be taking part in the tournament, arguing that the adequate biosecurity conditions were not in place to resume activities. That same day, LALA also declined to take part due to the same issues raised by Zulia.

The new format was announced on 18 September, with the group stage taking place in Barinas, Puerto Cabello and Valencia.

First stage
The first stage began on 30 January. Each team would play each other twice for 36 matchdays. It was scheduled to end on 25 October with the top eight teams advancing to the semi-finals and the bottom team being relegated. The first stage standings and matches up to the suspension of the league on 12 March were voided by the FVF on 15 May.

Standings

Results

Torneo de Normalización

Group stage
The 17 teams were drawn into two groups: one group of nine teams, hosted in Puerto Cabello and Valencia, and one group of eight teams, hosted in Barinas. The top teams in each group advanced to the Final to decide the league champions, the group runners-up decided their starting round in the Copa Libertadores qualifying stages, and the third and fourth placed teams qualified for the Copa Sudamericana. The draw was held on 18 September 2020.

Group A
Group A was played at La Bombonerita in Puerto Cabello and Estadio Misael Delgado in Valencia.

Standings

Results

Group B
Group B was played at Estadio Agustín Tovar in Barinas.

Standings

Results

Third place play-off
The winner qualified for the Copa Libertadores second stage, while the loser qualified for the first stage of said competition.

Final
The final was a single match at a neutral venue, played on 15 December 2020. The winners were crowned as the league champions.

Aggregate table

Top goalscorers

Source: Liga FUTVE

References

External links
  of the Venezuelan Football Federation 
 Liga FUTVE

Venezuela
Venezuelan Primera División seasons
1
Venezuela